The Luojiao River Bridge is a  long suspension bridge in the Dafang County of Guizhou, China. The bridge forms part of China National Highway 321 between Bijie and Guiyang. Three other high bridges sit along the stretch of highway between Bijie and Guiyang: the Liuguanghe Bridge, the Xixi Bridge, and the Wuxi Bridge. Construction of a dam on the river, downstream of the bridge has created a reservoir which extends under the bridge.

See also
List of highest bridges in the world

External links
http://highestbridges.com/wiki/index.php?title=Luojiaohe_Bridge_Guibi
http://en.structurae.de/structures/data/index.cfm?id=s0052361

Suspension bridges in China
Bridges in Guizhou
Bridges completed in 2001